Rabah Slimani (born 18 October 1989) is a French rugby union player who can play on both sides of the scrum; tight head prop and loose head prop, and he currently plays for ASM Clermont Auvergne in the Top 14.

Career
Slimani first discovered rugby in his home town of Sarcelles. While playing for AAS Sarcelles, he was spotted by Stade Français cadets and was invited to train with the squad in 2008. He made his professional club debut in 2009, and made his international debut with France, coming off the bench against New Zealand on 9 November 2013 at the Stade de France.

Personal life
Born in France, Slimani is of Algerian descent.

References

1989 births
Living people
French rugby union players
French sportspeople of Algerian descent
People from Sarcelles
Stade Français players
Rugby union props
Sportspeople from Val-d'Oise
France international rugby union players
ASM Clermont Auvergne players